Mandarinfish or mandarin fish may refer to:

Saltwater aquarium fish
Synchiropus splendidus, also known as the mandarin goby and the mandarin dragonet, native to the Pacific Ocean
Picturesque dragonet or Synchiropus picturatus, also known as the spotted mandarin, psychedelic mandarin or target mandarin, native to the Indo-West Pacific

Freshwater perch
Siniperca chuatsi, also known as the Chinese perch, native to China and Russia
Golden mandarin fish or Siniperca scherzeri, also known as the leopard mandarin fish, native to East Asia

See also
Mandarin dogfish (Cirrhigaleus barbifer) a dogfish shark species native to the North Pacific
Southern Mandarin dogfish (Cirrhigaleus australis) a related dogfish shark species also known as the southern mandarin dogfish, native to Australia and New Zealand